This is a list of famous or important Faroese people. In a small island-society of fewer than 50,000 inhabitants, each person can gain certain meaning for the entire nation. The people listed below, are among those who played or play a distinct role in Faroese culture, politics and history. Many of them are renowned outside the Faroes, especially in Denmark and other Nordic countries.

Artists

Authors and poets

 Heðin Brú
 Marianna Debes Dahl
 Joen Danielsen
 Hans Andrias Djurhuus
 Janus Djurhuus
 Jens Christian Djurhuus
 Bergtóra Hanusardóttir
 Jens Pauli Heinesen
 William Heinesen (also a painter, graphical artist and musician)
 Guðrið Helmsdal
 Rakel Helmsdal
 Regin Dahl
 Jógvan Isaksen
 Jørgen-Frantz Jacobsen
 Steinbjørn B. Jacobsen
 Poul F. Joensen
 Oddvør Johansen
 Hanus Kamban
 Sissal Kampmann
 Marjun Syderbø Kjelnæs
 Jóanes Nielsen
 Rói Patursson (also a philosopher)
 Kristian Osvald Viderø (also a clergyman)

Cinema and theatre artists and film people
Jacob Haugaard, actor, comedian, politician, member of the Danish Parliament
Heiðrikur á Heygum, filmmaker, musician and artist
Olaf Johannessen, stage and film actor
Katrin Ottarsdóttir, director
Helena Patursson, actress, feminist, and writer
Sakaris Stórá, film director
Hans Tórgarð, actor, stage director and playwright

Fashion

 Liffa Gregoriussen (1904–1992), fashion designer and feminist

Musicians

Peter Alberg, composer of the Faeroese Anthem
Lena Anderssen, singer-songwriter and guitarist
Greta Svabo Bech, singer, provided the vocals for deadmau5's track "Raise Your Weapon"
Aura Dione, pop singer songwriter
Kristian Blak, composer and musician
Tróndur Bogason, composer and musician 
Boys in a Band, indie rock band from Eysturoy, Faroe Islands; won 1st place in Global Battle of the Bands
Rúni Brattaberg, opera singer
The Dreams, Faroese punk/rock/pop band from Tórshavn; singer of the band is Hans Edward Andreassen
Brandur Enni, singer-songwriter, composer and musician
Bárður Háberg, musician, songwriter and composer, composes music for pop singers from Japan, Holland, Korea
Guðrið Hansdóttir, singer-songwriter, composer and musician
Jens Marni Hansen, singer-songwriter, rock singer and guitar player, participated in the Dansk Melodi Grand Prix 2010
Jógvan Hansen, singer and guitarist, participated in the Icelandic Eurovision Song Contest
Heiðrikur á Heygum, filmmaker, musician and artist
Óli Jógvansson, musician, songwriter, composer and producer
Jóannes Lamhauge, singer-songwriter, artist (painter), actor, graphic designer and film director
Teitur Lassen, singer-songwriter and guitarist
Høgni Lisberg, singer-songwriter
Dávur Juul Magnussen, trombonist, principal trombone chair of the Royal Scottish National Orchestra
Eivør Pálsdóttir, singer-songwriter and guitarist
Rani Petersen, known professionally as Reiley, singer and first Faroese person to represent any country (specifically Denmark)  in the Eurovision Song Contest
Sunnleif Rasmussen, composer
Høgni Reistrup, singer-songwriter and guitarist
Evi Tausen, country singer
Týr, Viking/progressive metal band, fronted by Heri Joensen

Painters, graphical artists and sculptors
 

Astrid Andreasen, textile, scientific and stamp artist
Aggi Ásgerð Ásgeirsdóttir, painter
Steffan Danielsen, painter
Hans Hansen, painter
Zacharias Heinesen, painter and graphical artist
Janus Kamban, sculptor
Sámal Joensen Mikines, painter
Hans Pauli Olsen, sculptor
Bárður Oskarsson, children's writer, illustrator and artist
Tróndur Patursson, painter, glass and iron sculptor, adventurer
Anker Eli Petersen, graphical and stamp artist, songwriter
Ingálvur av Reyni, painter, graphical artist
Vigdis Sigmundsdóttir, painter, artist
Ruth Smith, painter
Ole Wich conceptuel artist, photographer and graphical artist
Frida Zachariassen, painter, writer

Leaders and politicians

Historical
Sigmundur Brestisson, Viking age chieftain
Lucas Debes, conservative rebel
Floksmen, Faroese rebels in the Middle Ages
Tróndur í Gøtu, Viking age chieftain
Magnus Heinason, national hero, naval hero and privateer
Grímur Kamban, first settler
Naddoddur, Viking and settler
Nólsoyar Páll, national hero
Sverre Sigurðsson, king of Norway

Modern
Andrea Árting (1891–1988), trade union leader
Atli Dam, Prime Minister, 1970–1993 (periodically)
Jóannes Eidesgaard, Prime Minister, 2003–2008
Jona Henriksen (1924–2006), politician, one of the first women to be elected to the Løgting
Høgni Hoydal, Republican leader
Kaj Leo Johannesen, Prime Minister, 2008–2015
Karin Kjølbro (born 1944), politician, one of the first women to be elected to the Løgting
Anfinn Kallsberg, Prime Minister, 1998–2003
Marita Petersen, Prime Minister, 1993–1994
Malla Samuelsen (1909–1997), politician, first woman to sit in the Løgting

Scholars, scientists and academics

Niels Ryberg Finsen, physician, winner of Nobel Prize in Medicine and Physiology in 1903
Venceslaus Ulricus Hammershaimb, philologist
Jakob Jakobsen, linguist, philologist
Símun av Skarði, folk high school teacher
Jens Christian Svabo, scientist, philologist

Explorers and travellers
Magnus Heinason, national hero, naval hero and privateer
Ove Joensen, in 1986 journeyed alone in a rowboat from the Faroe Islands to Copenhagen in Denmark, a distance of 900 nautical miles (1,700 km), the first and only person so far to do this; the journey took 41 days
Grímur Kamban, first settler
Inger Klein Thorhauge, cruise ship Captain
Naddoddur, explored Iceland
Livar Nysted, crossed the North Atlantic Ocean from New York City to Great Britain in a rowboat with four rowers; they broke a 114-year-old world record
Sigert Patursson, traveled to western Siberia and the Kara Sea, Mongolia and Egypt and through Europe
Tróndur Patursson, has several times been on adventurous journeys with Tim Severin and others, first in 1976

Clergymen
Lucas Debes, conservative rebel
V. U. Hammershaimb, philologist
Daniel Jacob Danielsen, missionary and humanitarian worker
Jákup Dahl

Athletes
Katrina Akursmørk, football player 
Rannvá Andreasen, football player
Heidi Andreasen, swimmer, three-time silver medallist and two-time bronze medallist Paralympian
Lív Arge, football player
Ove Joensen, rowing legend
Pál Joensen, swimmer, triple European Junior Champion in Belgrade 2008; gold winner in 1500m freestyle at the FINA World Cup in Moscow 2009
Ásla Johannesen, football player
Todi Jónsson, former FC Copenhagen professional football player
Bára Klakstein, football player (defender) and coach
Jens Martin Knudsen, football player (goalkeeper)
Arnborg Lervig, football player
Gunnar Nielsen, first Faroese football player to play in the Premier League
Laila Pætursdóttir, football player
Gilli Rólantsson, professional football player
Livar Nysted, ocean rower, crossed the North Atlantic in a rowboat together with three others, setting a new world record
Bjørk Herup Olsen, middle and long distance runner, Danish Junior Champion
Regin Vágadal, strongman
Sverri Sandberg Nielsen, rower, mainly competes in the heavyweight single sculls.
Joahn Sundstein, professional eSportsman (Dota 2), 2x International Champion, 6x Major Champion.

Chess players 
Helgi Dam Ziska, is the top ranked and the highest ever rated player from his country, and has been rated number one amongst Faroese chess players since the age of 16. He is the first Faroese player to qualify for the Grandmaster title.

See also
List of people on stamps of the Faroe Islands
List of people by nationality

References